Barry Briggs  (born 30 December 1934) is a New Zealand former speedway rider.

Career
He won the World Individual Championship title four times – in 1957, 1958, 1964 and 1966. He appeared in a record 17 consecutive World Individual finals (1954–70), and a record 18 in all, during which he scored a record 201 points. He also won the London Riders' Championship in 1955 whilst riding for the Wimbledon Dons. He is also a six-time winner of the British Championship. He won the first final in 1961 and then dominated the sixties titles by winning in 1964, 1965, 1966, 1967, and 1969. Briggs also twice won his home title, the New Zealand Championship, winning in 1959 and again in 1963.

Briggs also created a domestic record by winning the British League Riders Championship for six consecutive years from 1965–1970, representing the Swindon Robins.

Briggs retired from British league racing in 1972 after an accident during Heat 5 of the World Final at Wembley Stadium with Swedish rider Bernt Persson. As a result of the accident, Briggs lost the index finger of his left hand, but returned in 1974, then announcing in 1975 that this would be his last season but actually returning for another year with Hull Vikings, retiring for a final time in 1976.

During the early to mid-1970s, Briggs was one of a number of World Champion riders (along with fellow kiwi Ivan Mauger and Denmark's Ole Olsen) as well as a number of others such as Edward Jancarz and Zenon Plech from Poland and England's Chris Pusey, who embarked on world tours to Australia, his native New Zealand and the USA. Their trips to the USA, primarily the Costa Mesa Speedway in Los Angeles, helped spark the American motorcycle speedway scene which had been dormant on the world stage since the pre-World War II days of 1937 World Champion Jack Milne, his brother Cordy Milne and Wilbur Lamoreaux.

After retirement
In 1973 Briggs was awarded an MBE for his services to sport and in 1990 he was inducted into the New Zealand Sports Hall of Fame. From 17 March 2010 Briggs took part in a John o' Groats to Land's End bike ride to raise money for the BBC's Sport Relief.

In retirement, Briggs became the mentor to many young riders who went on to race in World Finals including fellow Kiwi Mitch Shirra. He also lent his voice to television, becoming a respected speedway commentator in England and Europe, as well as the USA.

World final appearances

Individual World Championship
 1954 –  London, Wembley Stadium – 6th – 9pts
 1955 –  London, Wembley Stadium – 3rd – 12+2pts
 1956 –  London, Wembley Stadium – 7th – 10pts
 1957 –  London, Wembley Stadium – Winner – 14pts + 3pts
 1958 –  London, Wembley Stadium – Winner – 15pts
 1959 –  London, Wembley Stadium – 3rd – 11+3pts
 1960 –  London, Wembley Stadium – 6th – 9pts
 1961 –  Malmö, Malmö Stadion – 4th – 12pts + 1pt
 1962 –  London, Wembley Stadium – 2nd – 13pts
 1963 –  London, Wembley Stadium – 3rd – 12pts
 1964 –  Gothenburg, Ullevi – Winner – 15pts
 1965 –  London, Wembley Stadium – 4th – 10pts
 1966 –  Gothenburg, Ullevi – Winner – 15pts
 1967 –  London, Wembley Stadium – 5th – 11pts
 1968 –  Gothenburg, Ullevi – 2nd – 12pts
 1969 –  London, Wembley Stadium – 2nd – 11pts + 3pts
 1970 –  Wrocław, Olympic Stadium – 7th – 7pts
 1972 –  London, Wembley Stadium – 14th – 3pts

World Pairs Championship
 1971 -  Rybnik, Rybnik Municipal Stadium (with Ivan Mauger) - 2nd - 25pts (13)
 1974 -  Manchester, Hyde Road (with Ivan Mauger) - 3rd - 21pts (4)
 1976 -  Eskilstuna, Eskilstuna Motorstadion (with Ivan Mauger) - 5th - 15pts (7)

World Team Cup
 1962 -  Slaný (with Ronnie Moore / Peter Craven / Ron How / Cyril Maidment) - 2nd - 24pts (8)
 1963 -  Vienna, Stadion Wien (with Peter Craven / Dick Fisher / Peter Moore) - 3rd - 25pts (12)
 1964 -  Abensberg, Abensberg Stadion (with Ron How / Ken McKinlay / Nigel Boocock / Brian Brett) - 3rd - 21pts (9)
 1965 -  Kempten (with Charlie Monk / Nigel Boocock / Ken McKinlay / Jimmy Gooch) - 3rd - 18pts (1)
 1966 -  Wrocław, Olympic Stadium (with Nigel Boocock / Terry Betts / Ivan Mauger / Colin Pratt) - 4th - 8pts (1)
 1967 -  Malmö, Malmö Stadion (with Ray Wilson / Eric Boocock / Ivan Mauger / Colin Pratt) - 3rd= - 19pts (8)
 1968 -  London, Wembley Stadium (with Ivan Mauger / Nigel Boocock / Martin Ashby / Norman Hunter) - Winner - 40pts (7)
 1969 -  Rybnik, Rybnik Municipal Stadium (with Martin Ashby / Nigel Boocock / Ivan Mauger) - 2nd - 27pts (8)
 1970 -  London, Wembley Stadium  (with Ivan Mauger / Nigel Boocock / Eric Boocock / Ray Wilson) - 2nd - 31pts (11)
 1971 -  Wroclaw, Olympic Stadium (with Jim Airey / Ray Wilson / Ivan Mauger / Ronnie Moore) - Winner - 37pts (6)
Note: Briggs rode for Great Britain in the World Team Cup from 1962

World Longtrack Final
 1971 -  Oslo (6th) 10pts
 1975 -  Radgona (4th) 19pts
 1976 -  Marianske Lazne (11th) 7pts

External links
New Zealand Sports Hall of Fame
 http://grasstrackgb.co.uk/world-longtrack/

References

1934 births
Living people
New Zealand speedway riders
Sportspeople from Christchurch
New Zealand motorcycle racers
Individual Speedway World Champions
New Zealand Members of the Order of the British Empire
Swindon Robins riders
Hull Vikings riders
Wimbledon Dons riders
New Cross Rangers riders
Southampton Saints riders
British Speedway Championship winners
Individual Speedway Long Track World Championship riders